Greenway Parks is a neighborhood in north Dallas, Texas, bounded by the Dallas North Tollway on the east, Mockingbird Lane on the south, Inwood Road on the west, and University Boulevard on the north. It borders the city of Highland Park on the southeast and the city of University Park on the east.

In May 2003, Greenway Parks became Conservation District No. 10.

Education

Public schools 

The neighborhood is served by Dallas Independent School District public schools:

 K. B. Polk Center for Academically Talented and Gifted (Pre-K-5) in neighboring Elm Thicket/North Park neighborhood
 Edward H Cary Middle School (6-8) in Walnut Hill neighborhood
 Thomas Jefferson High School (9-12) in Walnut Hill neighborhood

Sudie L. Williams Talented and Gifted Academy (located in the nearby Bluffview neighborhood) serves academically talented and gifted students in grades four through six (expanding to eighth grade by 2020).  Admission to Williams is based on academic achievement and an application is required.

Henry W. Longfellow Career Exploration Academy (located next door within the Greenway Crest neighborhood) serves students in grades 6-8 selected through the magnet process. The students receive the same basic middle school program offered in all Dallas Independent School District middle schools. However, special focus is placed on the exploration and development of each student's interests and abilities.

Private schools 

Nearby private schools include Good Shepherd Episcopal School (PreK-8), St. Mark's School of Texas (1-12), The Hockaday School (PreK-12, Girls), Greenhill School (PreK-12), The Episcopal School of Dallas (PreK-12), Jesuit College Preparatory School of Dallas (9-12, Boys), The Lamplighter School (PreK-4), Ursuline Academy of Dallas, and Christ the King Catholic School (K-8).

Colleges and universities 

Greenway Parks is in the Dallas County Community College District, which offers academic, continuing education, and adult education programs through seven community colleges and 14 campuses in Dallas County.

References

External links 
 Greenway Parks Homeowner's Association
 Greenway Parks Neighborhood videos (YouTube)
 Greenway Parks Conservation District Ordinance
 Greenway Parks Conservation District Map
 City of Dallas Conservation District Ordinances